Robert J. Faucher is an American diplomat who has served as the United States ambassador to Suriname since January 31, 2023.

Early life and education 

Born in Landstuhl, Germany, Faucher grew up in Arizona, and holds Bachelor of Arts and Juris Doctor–Master of Business Administration degrees from Arizona State University, an Master of Laws degree in European Union Law from the University of Edinburgh, and a Master of Science degree in national security studies from the National War College of the National Defense University.

Career 

Faucher is a career member of the Senior Foreign Service in 1985 and has gained the rank of Minister-Counselor. Within the State Department, he served as director for the Office of Western European Affairs in the Bureau of European and Eurasian Affairs. He also has held positions as director in the offices of United Nations Political Affairs and UN Specialized and Technical Agencies in the Bureau of International Organization Affairs. He has served as the deputy chief of mission for embassies Belgium, Ireland, Suriname and Luxembourg. Other diplomatic missions include those of the Netherlands, the United States Mission to the European Union, and the United Kingdom.  While in Washington, D.C., his career included stints as deputy office director in the Office of European Union Affairs in the Bureau of European and Eurasian Affairs; special assistant in the Bureau of Intelligence and Research and attorney advisor for the Middle East and South Asia in the Legal Adviser's Office. Since 2019, he has served as the principal deputy assistant secretary for the Bureau of Conflict and Stabilization Operations.

U.S. ambassador to Suriname
On June 8, 2022, President Joe Biden nominated Faucher to be the next United States ambassador to Suriname. Hearings on his nomination were held before the Senate Foreign Relations Committee on July 28, 2022. The committee favorably reported his nomination on August 3, 2022. The United States Senate confirmed his nomination on December 13, 2022 by voice vote. He presented his credentials to President Chandrikapersad Santokhi on January 31, 2023.

Personal life
Faucher speaks Dutch and French.

See also
Ambassadors of the United States

References

20th-century American diplomats
21st-century American diplomats
Alumni of the University of Edinburgh
Arizona State University alumni
National War College alumni
People from Landstuhl
United States Assistant Secretaries of State
United States Department of State officials
United States Foreign Service personnel